The 2009–10 Dallas Stars season was the 43rd season for the National Hockey League franchise that was established on June 5, 1967.
The Stars introduce Joe Nieuwendyk as their new general manager, replacing Les Jackson and Brett Hull, who were both reassigned within the organization. On June 11, head coach Dave Tippett was fired and replaced with Marc Crawford.

Preseason

Regular season

Divisional standings

Conference standings

Schedule and results

Player statistics

Skaters

Note: GP = Games played; G = Goals; A = Assists; Pts = Points; +/− = Plus/minus; PIM = Penalty minutes

Goaltenders
Note: GP = Games played; TOI = Time on ice (minutes); W = Wins; L = Losses; OT = Overtime losses; GA = Goals against; GAA= Goals against average; SA= Shots against; SV= Saves; Sv% = Save percentage; SO= Shutouts

†Denotes player spent time with another team before joining Stars. Stats reflect time spent with the Stars only.
‡Traded mid-season
Bold/italics denotes franchise record

Awards and records

Awards

Records

Milestones

Transactions

The Stars have been involved in the following transactions during the 2009–10 season.

Trades

Free agents acquired

Free agents lost

Claimed via waivers

Lost via waivers

Player signings

Draft picks

The Stars' picks at the 2009 NHL Entry Draft in Montreal.

See also

 2009–10 NHL season

Farm teams

Texas Stars (AHL)
The Texas Stars played their inaugural season in 2009-10 after being granted limited membership into the league. The Stars finished the regular season second in the Western Division. In the 2010 Calder Cup Playoffs They swept Rockford in the first round, then beat Chicago and Hamilton in seven games to win the Western Division and Western Conference respectively. They lost to the Hershey Bears in game six of the 2010 Calder Cup Finals.

Idaho Steelheads (ECHL)
In 2009–10, the Steelheads clinched their first Brabham Cup with one week remaining in the season. They received a bye in the first round of the 2010 Kelly Cup Playoffs before sweeping the Utah Grizzlies in the conference semifinals and the Stockton Thunder in six games to win the National Conference Championship to advance to their 3rd Kelly Cup Finals since joining the league in 2003. They met the Cincinnati Cyclones in the finals, but lost the series 4–1, with each game being decided by only one goal.

Allen Americans (CHL)
On April 15, 2009, the Central Hockey League announced an expansion team for Allen, Texas, to begin play in the 2009–10 season. The Allen Americans finished second in the Southern Conference. In the playoffs, Allen beat Laredo and Odessa in seven games. The Rapid City Rush beat the Americans in game six of the 2010 Ray Miron President's Cup Finals.

References

External links
2009–10 Dallas Stars season at ESPN
2009–10 Dallas Stars season at Hockey Reference

Dallas Stars seasons
D
D